The 2006 NCAA Division I Men's Tennis Championships were the 60th annual men's and 24th annual women's championships to determine the national champions of NCAA Division I singles, doubles, and team collegiate tennis in the United States. The tournaments were played concurrently during May 2006, the first time the men's and women's championships were held at the same site.

Pepperdine defeated Georgia in the men's championship match, 4–2, to claim the Waves' first team national title.

Meanwhile, three-time defending champions, and hosts, Stanford defeated Miami (FL) in the women's title match, 4–1, to claim their fifteenth team national championship.

See also
NCAA Division II Tennis Championships (Men, Women)
NCAA Division III Tennis Championships (Men, Women)

References

External links
List of NCAA Men's Tennis Champions
List of NCAA Women's Tennis Champions

NCAA Division I tennis championships
NCAA Division I Tennis Championships
NCAA Division I Tennis Championships
NCAA Division I Tennis Championships
Tennis in California